Vesela Balka may refer to the following places in Ukraine:

Vesela Balka, Mykolaiv Oblast, village in Kazanka Raion, Mykolaiv Oblast
Vesela Balka, Tatarbunary Raion, village in Tatarbunary Raion, Odessa Oblast
Vesela Balka, Zakharivka Raion, village in Zakharivka Raion, Odessa Oblast